Return to Life is a 1949 French drama portmanteau film in five parts directed by Georges Lampin, André Cayatte, Henri-Georges Clouzot and Jean Dréville (who directed the last two parts). It was entered into the 1949 Cannes Film Festival.

Cast
 Paul Azaïs as the captain
 Bernard Blier as Gaston 
 Jean Brochard as the Hotel tender
 Léonce Corne as Virolet 
 Janine Darcey as Mary 
 Max Elloy as the old barman
 Louis Florencie as the chief of police
 Paul Frankeur as the maire
 Jacques Hilling as a soldier 
 Louis Jouvet as Jean Girard 
 Léon Larive as Jules, the guard
 Héléna Manson as Simone
 Marie-France Plumer as Aunt Berth
 Noël-Noël as René
 Jeanne Pérez as the mother
 François Périer as Antoine
 Serge Reggiani as Louis, the husband of the young German
 Patricia Roc as Lieutenant Evelyne 
 Noël Roquevert as the commander
 Maurice Schutz as the old man

See also
 Henri-Georges Clouzot filmography

References

External links

1949 films
1949 drama films
1940s French-language films
French black-and-white films
Films directed by Georges Lampin
Films directed by André Cayatte
Films directed by Henri-Georges Clouzot
Films directed by Jean Dréville
French anthology films
French drama films
1940s French films